In mathematics and computer science, a balanced boolean function is a boolean function whose output yields as many 0s as 1s over its input set. This means that for a uniformly random input string of bits, the probability of getting a 1 is 1/2.

Examples of balanced boolean functions are the function that copies the first bit of its input to the output,
and the function that produces the exclusive or of the input bits.

Usage 
Balanced boolean functions are primarily used in cryptography.  If a function is not balanced, it will have a statistical bias, making it subject to cryptanalysis such as the correlation attack.

See also 
 Bent function

References 
 Balanced boolean functions that can be evaluated so that every input bit is unlikely to be read, Annual ACM Symposium on Theory of Computing

Boolean algebra